The men's 5000 metres at the 2012 World Junior Championships in Athletics was held at the Estadi Olímpic Lluís Companys on 14 July.

Medalists

Records
, the existing world junior and championship records were as follows.

Results

Participation
According to an unofficial count, 23 athletes from 16 countries participated in the event.

References

External links
WJC12 5000 metres schedule

5000 metres
Long distance running at the World Athletics U20 Championships